Julian Power Alexander (December 7, 1887 – January 1, 1953) was an American attorney and an associate justice on the Mississippi Supreme Court, where he served from 1941 until his death.

Biography
Julian Alexander was the son of Charlton Henry Alexander and Matilda Macmillan Alexander.  He received his secondary education in Jackson, Mississippi and attended Millsaps College and Southwestern Presbyterian University.  He received an AB degree from Princeton University in 1908, and an LL.B. from the University of Mississippi School of Law in 1910.

In 1913, Julian married Corabel Wharton Roberts, with whom he had three children.

Political offices
Assistant U.S. Attorney for the Southern District of Mississippi (1916-1919)
U.S. Attorney for the Southern District of Mississippi (1919-1922)
Circuit Court judge for the seventh District of Mississippi (1934-1939)
Associate justice for the Mississippi Supreme Court (1941-1953)

Legal author
Alexander, Julian P. 1953. Mississippi Jury Instructions. St. Paul: West Publishing Company.

Death and legacy
Alexander died from coronary thrombosis in New Orleans, Louisiana, on January 1, 1953, while attending the Sugar Bowl football game at Tulane Stadium.  He was interred at Cedar Lawn Cemetery in Jackson, Mississippi.

Alexander's portrait is part of the Mississippi Hall of Fame located in the Old Capitol Museum to honor his significant contributions to the state of Mississippi.

References

External links

1887 births
1953 deaths
People from Jackson, Mississippi
Justices of the Mississippi Supreme Court
Circuit court judges in the United States
University of Mississippi School of Law alumni
Princeton University alumni
20th-century American judges